Nuclear factor erythroid 2-related factor 2 (NRF2), also known as nuclear factor erythroid-derived 2-like 2, is a transcription factor that in humans is encoded by the NFE2L2 gene. NRF2  is a basic leucine zipper (bZIP) protein that may regulate the expression of antioxidant proteins that protect against oxidative damage triggered by injury and inflammation, according to preliminary research. In vitro, NRF2 binds to antioxidant response elements (AREs) in the promoter regions of genes encoding cytoprotective proteins. NRF2 induces the expression of heme oxygenase 1 in vitro leading to an increase in phase II enzymes.  NRF2 also inhibits the NLRP3 inflammasome.

NRF2 appears to participate in a complex regulatory network and performs a pleiotropic role in the regulation of metabolism, inflammation, autophagy, proteostasis, mitochondrial physiology, and immune responses.  Several drugs that stimulate the NFE2L2 pathway are being studied for treatment of diseases that are caused by oxidative stress.

A mechanism for hormetic dose responses is proposed in which Nrf2 may serve as an hormetic mediator that mediates a vast spectrum of chemopreventive processes.

Structure 

NRF2 is a basic leucine zipper (bZip) transcription factor with a Cap “n” Collar (CNC) structure. NRF2 possesses seven highly conserved domains called NRF2-ECH homology (Neh) domains. The Neh1 domain is a CNC-bZIP domain that allows Nrf2 to heterodimerize with small Maf proteins (MAFF, MAFG, MAFK).  The Neh2 domain allows for binding of NRF2 to its cytosolic repressor Keap1.
The Neh3 domain may play a role in NRF2 protein stability and may act as a transactivation domain, interacting with component of the transcriptional apparatus.
The Neh4 and Neh5 domains also act as transactivation domains, but bind to a different protein called cAMP Response Element Binding Protein (CREB), which possesses intrinsic histone acetyltransferase activity.
The Neh6 domain may contain a degron that is involved in a redox-insensitive process of degradation of NRF2. This occurs even in stressed cells, which normally extend the half-life of NRF2 protein relative to unstressed conditions by suppressing other degradation pathways.
The "Neh7" domain is involved in the repression of Nrf2 transcriptional activity by the retinoid X receptor α through a physical association between the two proteins.

Localization and function 

NFE2L2 and other genes, such as NFE2, NFE2L1 and NFE2L3, encode basic leucine zipper (bZIP) transcription factors. They share highly conserved regions that are distinct from other bZIP families, such as JUN and FOS, although remaining regions have diverged considerably from each other.

Under normal or unstressed conditions, NRF2 is kept in the cytoplasm by a cluster of proteins that degrade it quickly. Under oxidative stress, NRF2 is not degraded, but instead travels to the nucleus where it binds to a DNA promoter and initiates transcription of antioxidative genes and their proteins.

NRF2 is kept in the cytoplasm by Kelch like-ECH-associated protein 1 (KEAP1) and Cullin 3, which degrade NRF2 by ubiquitination. Cullin 3 ubiquitinates NRF2, while Keap1 is a substrate adaptor protein that facilitates the reaction. Once NRF2 is ubiquitinated, it is transported to the proteasome, where it is degraded and its components recycled. Under normal conditions, NRF2 has a half-life of only 20 minutes. Oxidative stress or electrophilic stress disrupts critical cysteine residues in Keap1, disrupting the Keap1-Cul3 ubiquitination system. When NRF2 is not ubiquitinated, it builds up in the cytoplasm, and translocates into the nucleus. In the nucleus, it combines (forms a heterodimer) with one of small Maf proteins (MAFF, MAFG, MAFK) and binds to the antioxidant response element (ARE) in the upstream promoter region of many antioxidative genes, and initiates their transcription.

Target genes 

Activation of NRF2 induces the transcription of genes encoding cytoprotective proteins.  These include:

 NAD(P)H quinone oxidoreductase 1 (Nqo1) is a prototypical NRF2 target protein which catalyzes the reduction and detoxification of highly reactive quinones that can cause redox cycling and oxidative stress.
 Glutamate-cysteine ligase catalytic subunit (GCLC) and glutamate-cysteine ligase regulatory subunit (GCLM) form a heterodimer, which is the rate-limiting step in the synthesis of glutathione (GSH), a very powerful endogenous antioxidant. Both Gclc and Gclm are characteristic NRF2 target genes, which establish NRF2 as a regulator of glutathione, one of the most important antioxidants in the body.
 Sulfiredoxin 1 (SRXN1) and Thioredoxin reductase 1 (TXNRD1) support the reduction and recovery of peroxiredoxins, proteins important in the detoxification of highly reactive peroxides, including hydrogen peroxide and peroxynitrite.
 Heme oxygenase-1 (HMOX1, HO-1) is an enzyme that catalyzes the breakdown of heme into the antioxidant biliverdin, the anti-inflammatory agent carbon monoxide, and iron.  HO-1 is a NRF2 target gene that has been shown to protect from a variety of pathologies, including sepsis, hypertension, atherosclerosis, acute lung injury, kidney injury, and pain. In a recent study, however, induction of HO-1 has been shown to exacerbate early brain injury after intracerebral hemorrhage.
 The glutathione S-transferase (GST) family includes cytosolic, mitochondrial, and microsomal enzymes that catalyze the conjugation of GSH with endogenous and xenobiotic electrophiles. After detoxification by glutathione (GSH) conjugation catalyzed by GSTs, the body can eliminate potentially harmful and toxic compounds.  GSTs are induced by NRF2 activation and represent an important route of detoxification.
 The UDP-glucuronosyltransferase (UGT) family catalyze the conjugation of a glucuronic acid moiety to a variety of endogenous and exogenous substances, making them more water-soluble and readily excreted.  Important substrates for glucuronidation include bilirubin and acetaminophen. NRF2 has been shown to induce UGT1A1 and UGT1A6.
 Multidrug resistance-associated proteins (Mrps) are important membrane transporters that efflux various compounds from various organs and into bile or plasma, with subsequent excretion in the feces or urine, respectively. Mrps have been shown to be upregulated by NRF2 and alteration in their expression can dramatically alter the pharmacokinetics and toxicity of compounds.
 Kelch-like ECH-associated protein 1 is also a primary target of NFE2L2. Several interesting studies have also identified this hidden circuit in NRF2 regulations. In the mouse Keap1 (INrf2) gene, Lee and colleagues   found that an AREs located on a negative strand can subtly connect Nrf2 activation to Keap1 transcription. When examining NRF2 occupancies in human lymphocytes, Chorley and colleagues identified an approximately 700 bp locus within the KEAP1 promoter region was consistently top rank enriched, even at the whole-genome scale. These basic findings have depicted a mutually influenced pattern between NRF2 and KEAP1. NRF2-driven KEAP1 expression characterized in human cancer contexts, especially in human squamous cell cancers, implicated a new perspective in understanding NRF2 signaling regulation.

Tissue distribution 

NRF2 is ubiquitously expressed with the highest concentrations (in descending order) in the kidney, muscle, lung, heart, liver, and brain.

Clinical relevance 

Dimethyl fumarate, marketed as Tecfidera by Biogen Idec, was approved by the Food and Drug Administration in March 2013 following the conclusion of a Phase III clinical trial which demonstrated that the drug reduced relapse rates and increased time to progression of disability in people with multiple sclerosis. The mechanism of action of dimethyl fumarate is not well understood. Dimethyl fumarate (and its metabolite, monomethyl fumarate) activates the NRF2 pathway and has been identified as a nicotinic acid receptor agonist in vitro. The label includes warnings about the risk of anaphylaxis and angioedema, progressive multifocal leukoencephalopathy (PML), lymphopenia, and liver damage; other adverse effects include flushing and gastrointestinal events, such as diarrhea, nausea, and upper abdominal pain.

The dithiolethiones are a class of organosulfur compounds, of which oltipraz, an NRF2 inducer, is most well understood. Oltipraz inhibits cancer formation in rodent organs, including the bladder, blood, colon, kidney, liver, lung, pancreas, stomach, and trachea, skin, and mammary tissue. However, clinical trials of oltipraz have not demonstrated efficacy and have shown significant side effects, including neurotoxicity and gastrointestinal toxicity. Oltipraz also generates superoxide radicals, which can be toxic.

Associated pathology 
Genetic activation of NRF2 may promote the development of de novo cancerous tumors as well as the development of atherosclerosis by raising plasma cholesterol levels and cholesterol content in the liver. It has been suggested that the latter effect may overshadow the potential benefits of antioxidant induction afforded by NRF2 activation.

Interactions 

NFE2L2 has been shown to interact with MAFF, MAFG, MAFK, C-jun,  CREBBP, EIF2AK3, KEAP1, and UBC.

See also 
 Heme oxygenase
 Carbon monoxide-releasing molecules

References

External links 
 

Transcription factors